Wellington Regiment may refer to:

Cavalry regiments
 Wellington Mounted Rifles Regiment (1914–1919)
 Queen Alexandra's (Wellington West Coast) Mounted Rifles
 Wellington East Coast Mounted Rifles

Infantry regiments
 Duke of Wellington's Regiment (1702–2006)
 Wellington West Coast Regiment (1860-1948)
 Wellington Regiment (City of Wellington's Own)  (1867–1964)
 Wellington Infantry Regiment (NZEF) (1914–1919)
 153rd (Wellington) Battalion, CEF (1915–1917)
 Wellington West Coast and Taranaki Regiment (1948–2012)
 7th (Wellington (City of Wellington's Own) and Hawke's Bay) Battalion, Royal New Zealand Infantry Regiment (1964–2012)